The archiepiscopal seminary of Milan is the Catholic seminary of the Archdiocese of Milan.

It has three seats: in Venegono Inferiore (Varese province), Seveso (Monza e Brianza Province) and in Milan. The latter also hosts the Istituto sacerdotale Maria Immacolata, that trains priests during the first five years following ordination, and the Istituto Superiore di Scienze Religiose; other diocesan activities have taken place there. In the other two sites seminarist theology training is conducted: in Seveso I and II theology with the corso propedeutico, in Venegono from III to VI theology.

History
The first seminary dates to the times of Charles Borromeo, opening in 1564. Under the bishopric of Federico Borromeo the Seminary of Porta Orientale took final form.  St. Charles built several locations in the diocese.

From 1638 to 1784 three operated in Milan (the Seminary of Porta Orientale, the Seminary of Canonica, the Collegio Elvetico), along with four minor seminaries in Monza, Arona, Celana and Pollegio.

First reform school and then the presence of Napoleon's troops radically transformed the seminary: the diocesan seminaries Celana, Collegio Elvetico, Seminary of Canonica and later Arona closed; a structure in Castello above Lecco  opened instead. In 1839 that seat transferred to the Dominican convent of St. Peter Martyr in Seveso. With this step the configuration seminary route became simplified: ginnasio in Seveso, liceo in Monza and theology in Milan.

In the second part of the nineteenth century a seminary for poor students opened in Monza, entrusted to Barnabite Luigi Villoresi: training became more flexible and open according to inspiration from Antonio Rosmini. The resulting clergy were visibly different from the traditional way: this led to tensions. In 1900 a seminary opened near the Duomo that took the name Seminarietto, aimed at training those who were intended for liturgical service in the cathedral.

Following the apostolic visitation of abbot Alfredo Ildefonso Schuster, then Archbishop of Milan, the site of Venegono Inferiore was built with the intention to move the center of the seminary there. Construction began in 1928 and the facility was solemnly inaugurated in 1935. In the following decades, when the liceo classico and the last three years of theology were placed in Venegono, several locations were used: Seveso (medie-ginnasio), Masnago (elementari-medie), Arcore (medie), Merate (medie), Seminarietto del Duomo (ginnasio-liceo), Saronno (biennium theological and comunità propedeutica), Milano (adult vocations).

In 1966 Cardinal Giovanni Colombo decided to transfer the theological faculty (built by Pope Leo XIII in 1892) from Venegono Inferiore to Milan, thus forming the Facoltà Teologica dell'Italia Settentrionale.

The vocational crisis in subsequent years forced a reorganization of the community and led to the closure of many facilities. In 1985 the site was closed in Seveso: the ginnasio was transferred to Venegono and after a few years began restructuring. When construction ended in 1998 the community since then living in Saronno was transferred in Seveso. With the gradual extinction of the minor Seminary (closed in 2002 after several attempts for renewal and revitalization), the comunità propedeutica was added to the biennium seminary in Seveso.

The restoration of the permanent diaconate wanted by Cardinal Carlo Maria Martini in 1986 found a place in the headquarters of the Seminary.

Seminarists, professors and educators
Popes:
 Pius XI
Bishops and cardinals
 Giacomo Biffi
 Franco Giulio Brambilla
 Gabriele Giordano Caccia
 Adriano Caprioli
 Bernardo Citterio
 Francesco Coccopalmerio
 Diego Coletti
 Carlo Colombo
 Giovanni Colombo
 Renato Corti
 Mario Delpini
 Erminio De Scalzi
 Marco Ferrari
 Gervasio Gestori
 Giovanni Giudici
 Alessandro Maggiolini
 Angelo Mascheroni
 Attilio Nicora
 Giulio Oggioni
 Gianfranco Ravasi
 Carlo Roberto Maria Redaelli
 Giovanni Saldarini
 Luigi Stucchi
 Dionigi Tettamanzi
Theologians
 Giuseppe Colombo
 Franco Manzi
 Giovanni Moioli
 Pierangelo Sequeri
 Luigi Serenthà
 Sergio Ubbiali

Sources
 Il Seminario di Venegono 1935-1985. Pagine d'un cammino, a cura di Cesare Pasini - Mario Spezzibottiani, NED, Milano 1985.
 Mario Panizza, «Seminario Maggiore», in Dizionario della Chiesa ambrosiana, NED, Milano 1992, vol. V, 3310-3323.
 La formazione del presbitero diocesano. Linee educative del Seminario di Milano, Centro Ambrosiano, Milano 1995.
 Dionigi Tettamanzi, San Carlo e il seminario. La formazione dei futuri presbiteri in un mondo che cambia, Centro Ambrosiano, Milano 2006.

External links
 Seminario Arcivescovile di Milano website
 Permanent diaconate of Diocese of Milan
 Istituto Superiore di Scienze Religiose of Milan

Seminaries and theological colleges in Italy